Zdeslav was a duke in Croatia from 878 until his death in 879. He was from the Trpimirović dynasty.

Biography
Zdeslav was the son of Trpimir I. After his father's death in 864, an uprising was launched by a powerful Croatian nobleman from Knin called Domagoj. Zdeslav was exiled along with his brothers Petar and Muncimir to Constantinople. Domagoj died in 876, and was succeeded by his son. Zdeslav overthrew him in 878 with the help of the Byzantines, expelled Domagoj's sons and restored peace with Venice. The peace, at least in the case of Croatia, would practically last until the end of 10th century. He most probably acknowledged the supreme rule of Byzantine Emperor Basil I, and Dalmatia (theme) influence expanded further into land, but not much.

In 879, Pope John VIII asked Duke Zdeslav for an armed escort and protection for his legate who was crossing Croatia on his way to Bulgaria, ruled by Boris I. In early May 879, Zdeslav was killed by arrows near Knin in an uprising led by Branimir, a relative from Domagoj, possibly instigated by Pope John VIII fearing Byzantine power. However, something like that would have happened anyway because both Byzantine and Carolingian powers diminished in the region.

References

Further reading

879 deaths
Dukes of Croatia
Trpimirović dynasty
9th-century Croatian people
Year of birth unknown
9th-century Byzantine people
Byzantine people of Slavic descent
Slavic warriors